{{DISPLAYTITLE:C28H42O4}}
The molecular formula C28H42O4 (molar mass: 442.63 g/mol) may refer to:

 Hydroxyprogesterone heptanoate (OHPH), or OHPE
 Medroxyprogesterone caproate (MPC)

Molecular formulas